Jackie McLean & Co. is a studio album by saxophonist Jackie McLean. It was recorded and released in 1957 on Prestige. It was also reissued on New Jazz Records as NJ 8323. It features McLean in a quintet with trumpeter Bill Hardman, pianist Mal Waldron, bassist Doug Watkins and drummer Art Taylor. Tuba player Ray Draper appears on three tracks.

Track listing 
"Flickers" (Waldron) - 6:59
"Help" (Watkins) - 8:42
"Minor Dream" (Draper) - 7:50
"Beau Jack" (McLean) - 11:26
"Mirage" (Waldron) - 9:50

Personnel
Jackie McLean - alto sax
Bill Hardman - trumpet
Ray Draper - tuba (#1-3)
Mal Waldron - piano
Doug Watkins - bass
Art Taylor - drums

References 

1957 albums
Jackie McLean albums
Albums produced by Bob Weinstock
Prestige Records albums